Vaki is a village in Põhja-Pärnumaa Parish, Pärnu County in southwestern Estonia. It has a population of 129 (as of 29 September 2010).

References

Villages in Pärnu County